The Municipality of Mozirje is a municipality in the traditional region of Styria in northeastern Slovenia. The seat of the municipality is the town of Mozirje. Mozirje became a municipality in 1994.

Settlements
In addition to the municipal seat of Mozirje, the municipality also includes the following settlements:

 Brezje
 Dobrovlje pri Mozirju
 Lepa Njiva
 Ljubija
 Loke pri Mozirju
 Radegunda
 Šmihel nad Mozirjem

References

External links

Municipality of Mozirje on Geopedia
Mozirje municipal site

Mozirje
1994 establishments in Slovenia